BNS Karnafuli was a  ASW patrol boat in service with the Bangladesh Navy.

Armament
The ship was armed with two Bofors 40 mm L/70 guns and four 20 mm cannon. Beside it carried two 128 mm rocket launchers and two racks for Mk 6 Projectors for ASW operations. She was mainly used as ASW ship in Bangladesh Navy.

Career
The ship along with her sister ship  were acquired from former Yugoslavia in 1975 and commissioned on 6 June 1975. BNS Karnafuli was reduced to reserve in 1988 but was re-engined in 1995 and reactivated. She returned to active service. After serving the Bangladesh Navy for around 47 years, she was decommissioned from service on 9 November, 2022.

See also
List of historic ships of the Bangladesh Navy
BNS Tista

References

  
 

Ships built in Croatia
Submarine chasers of Bangladesh Navy
Decommissioned ships of the Bangladesh Navy